Theodosia Ntokou (Rhodes Greece) is a Greek classical pianist.

Biography 
Theodosia Ntokou was born on the island of Rhodes to a family of music lovers. Her mother, Mary Vergoti is a school teacher, her father, Panagiotis, is the commander of the harbor of Rhodes and her younger brother George is a medical doctor.

Theodosia began to study piano at the age of twelve to a small section of the conservatory in Rhodes, and after the director of the conservatory spotted her talent, Theodosia and her mother went on traveling thirty-two hours from Rhodes to Athens and back every weekend by ship for one hour lesson at the National Conservatory. That went on until Theodosia turned sixteen and moved to Athens.

Starting at sixteen Theodosia studied for five years at the National Conservatory with Aris Garufalis, and graduated with honors, and as she has quoted many times he was "The professor who built her character, and told her never to give up".

Theodosia then continued her studies with Hungarian pianist Laszlo Simon at the Universität der Künste in Berlin and simultaneously received her Postgraduate Degree from the Franz Liszt Academy of Budapest. Theodosia moved to America, where she completed her master's degree with Russian pianist Oxana Yablonskaya and went on to earn her assistantship at the prestigious University of Hartford-The Hartt School in Connecticut.

Theodosia Ntokou  has also performed in many festivals across Europe such as the prestigious Progetto Martha Argerich, the Ravello Festival, the Athens & Epidaurus Festival, the Martha Argerich Festival, the Crans-Montana "Les Sommets du Classique", the Armonie d'Arte Festival, the Busko Zdrój Festival in Poland, the Rolandseck Festival in Germany, the Sagra Musicale Malatestiana, the Festival Pianistico Brescia e Bergamo and the Carloforte Music Festival in Italy and has collaborated with many orchestras such as the Royal Philharmonic Orchestra, the Amsterdam Sinfonietta, the Berliner Symphoniker, the Athens State Orchestra and the Berliner Camerata, the Youth Orchestra of Bahia among others.

Theodosia has been performing extensively in many prestigious halls through Asia, Europe and the United States.

An important step in her life was her meeting in 2009 with the legendary pianist Martha Argerich, who after an audition, became her mentor, inspiration and has led her to new paths in her career. Since then, Theodosia  has been under her guidance.

The China Music Series 
Theodosia Ntokou has made reality one of her wishes, as in November 2021, she will realize her new annual Classical Music Festival called China Music Series (Chinese: 中国南方音乐周) and will take place at the Guangzhou Opera House.

As a Founder and Artistic Director of the Series, Theodosia's vision is to welcome at the festival, top artists who will perform and captivate the audiences. Artists such as Martha Argerich, Maxim Vengerov, Steven Isserlis, Daniel Hope and Guy Braunstein among many others, will be gracing the stage with their presence and talent.

Prizes and Awards 

Theodosia has received the following prizes and awards.

 2006: Young Artists International Piano Competition - Winner
 2007: Bradshaw & Buono International Piano Competition  Winner
 2008: Evelyn Bonnar Scholarship Award 
 2021: Opus Klassik Awards / Best Chamber Music Award - Nomination

Discography 

 2009 Ludwig van Beethoven, Concerto for piano and orchestra Nr. 3, Op. 37 in C minor. Acte Préalable
 2020: Ludwig van Beethoven, Symphony No.6 "Pastorale" arr. 4 hands by Selmar Bagge together with Martha Argerich and the Sonata Op.31 No.2 "Tempest". Warner Classics

Reviews 

In a review of Argerich's and Ntokou's new Beethoven album, Norman Lebrecht from Slipped Disc wrote:

    Is nothing like you've ever heard...The most musical account since...Bruno Walter, maybe

and the LA Times mentioned:

    Refreshes as though the Pastorale were bathed in a crystalline mountain stream

The BBC Music Magazine has praised Theodosia as:

    Dramatically poised, classically aware, emotionally supple, and refreshing

See also 

The China Music Series
The China Music Series - Twitter
The China Music Series - Instagram
Theodosia Ntokou - Official Website
Theodosia Ntokou - Twitter
Theodosia Ntokou - Instagram

References

External links 
Theodosia Ntokou - Official Website

Women classical pianists
Greek women pianists
Child classical musicians
Living people
21st-century classical pianists
Greek classical pianists
20th-century classical pianists
Year of birth missing (living people)
People from Rhodes
20th-century women pianists
21st-century women pianists